Yvonne Rainer (born November 24, 1934) is an American dancer, choreographer, and filmmaker, whose work in these disciplines is regarded as challenging and experimental. Her work is sometimes classified as minimalist art. Rainer currently lives and works in New York.

Early life
Yvonne Rainer was born on November 24, 1934, in San Francisco, California. Rainer's parents, Joseph and Jeanette, considered themselves radicals. Her mother, a stenographer, was born in Brooklyn to Jewish immigrants from Warsaw, and her father, a stonemason and house painter, was born in Vallanzengo, northern Italy, whence he emigrated at the age of 21.  Rainer grew up, along with an older brother, in the Sunset district of San Francisco that she describes as "a neighborhood of white Protestant working class families." From the age of twelve, she was "exposed to the heady commingling of poets, painters, writers, and Italian anarchists." Throughout her childhood her father took her to foreign films at the Palace of the Legion of Honor, while her mother took her to the ballet and opera. She attended Lowell High School, and after graduation she enrolled in San Francisco Junior College and dropped out after a year.

In her late teens, while earning her living as a clerk-typist at an insurance company, Rainer found herself hanging out at the Cellar, a jazz club in North Beach in San Francisco, where she would listen to poets accompanied by live cool jazz musicians. It was here that she met Al Held, a painter. He introduced her to various artists who were natives of New York. In August, 1956, at the age of 21, she followed Held to New York and lived with him for the next three years.

I remember walking down 5th Avenue past Madison Square Park, overwhelmed by an ineffable sense of infinite possibility. Someone else might have described it as a 'conquer-the-world' kind of feeling. For me it was simply pure open-minded excitement. Though I had no idea what the future held, it was already signalling with open arms.

Doris Casella, a musician and close friend, introduced Rainer around 1957 to the dance classes of Edith Stephen, a modern dancer. At her first class Stephen told her that she was not very "turned out." Rainer admits, "What she didn't say was something that I would gradually recognize in the next couple of years, that my lack of turn-out and limberness coupled with a long back and short legs would reduce my chances of performing with any established dance company." Beginning in 1959, she studied for a year at the Martha Graham School, where Graham notoriously told her, "When you accept yourself as a woman, you will have turn-out"; later she took ballet classes with Mia Slavenska followed by classes with James Waring, in whose company she danced briefly, and for eight years she studied with Merce Cunningham.

In the year in which Rainer studied at the Graham School – 1959-60 – Rainer met Simone Forti and Nancy Meehan, who had worked with Anna Halprin and Welland Lathrop in San Francisco. In early summer of 1960 the three of them rented a New York studio and worked on movement improvisations. In August of that year Rainer traveled with Forti to Marin County, CA to take Halprin's summer workshop, which was very important, in addition to Forti's influence, to Rainer's early solo dance work.

In the fall of 1960 both Forti and Rainer attended the choreography workshop that musician-composer Robert Dunn began to conduct in the Cunningham studio based on the theories of John Cage. The other members of this course were Steve Paxton, Ruth Emerson, Paulus Berenson, and Marni Mahaffey. It was here that Rainer created and performed her earliest dances.

Dance and choreographic work

In 1962, at the age of 27, Rainer, Steve Paxton, and Ruth Emerson approached the Reverend Al Carmines at the Judson Memorial Church to ask if they could begin performing there. The Church was already known for the Judson Poets' Theater and Judson Art Gallery, which had been showing the work of Claes Oldenburg, Allan Kaprow, Robert Whitman, Jim Dine, and Tom Wesselmann. It now became a focal point for vanguard dance activity and concerts of dance.

Rainer is noted for an approach to dance that treats "the body more as the source of an infinite variety of movements" than as the purveyor of plot or drama. Many of the elements she employed—such as repetition, tasks, and indeterminacy—later became standard features of contemporary dance. In 1965, when writing about a recent dance — Parts of Some Sextets — for the Tulane Drama Review, she ended the essay with what became her notorious No Manifesto, which she "reconsidered" in 2008.

In her early dances, Rainer focused on sounds and movements and often juxtaposed the two in arbitrary combinations. Inspired by the chance procedures favored by Cage and Cunningham, Rainer's choreography was a combination of classical dance steps contrasted with pedestrian movement. She used a great deal of repetition and employed spoken language and oral noises (including squeaks, and shrieks, etc.) within the body of her dances.

Repetition and sound were employed in her first choreographed piece, Three Satie Spoons (1961), a solo in three parts performed by Rainer to the accompaniment of Eric Satie's Trois Gymnopedies.  The last section contained a repeated "beep beep beep in a falsetto squeak and the spoken line: "The grass is greener when the sun is yellower." Over time her work shifted to include more narrative and cohesive spoken words. Ordinary Dance (1962) was a combination of movement and narrative, and featured the repetition of simple movements while Rainer recited an autobiographical monologue containing the names of the streets on which she had lived while in San Francisco. One characteristic of Rainer's early choreography was her fascination with using untrained performers. We Shall Run (1963) had twelve performers, both dancers and non-dancers who, clad in street clothes, ran around the stage in various floor patterns for twelve minutes to the "Tuba Mirum" from Berlioz's Requiem. Her first evening length choreography, for six dancers, called Terrain, was performed at Judson Church in 1963.

One of Rainer's most famous pieces, Trio A (1966), was initially the first section of an evening-long work entitled The Mind Is a Muscle. Her decision in "Trio A" to execute movements with an even distribution of energy reflected a challenge to traditional attitudes to "phrasing," which can be defined as the way in which energy is distributed in the execution of a movement or series of movements. The innovation of Trio A lies in its attempt to erase the differences of energy investment within both a given phrase and the transition from one to another, resulting in an absence of the classical appearance of "attack" at the beginning of a phrase, recovery at the end, with energy arrested somewhere in the middle, as in a grand jeté. Another characteristic of this five-minute dance is that the performer never makes eye contact with the spectators, and in the instance in which the movement requires the dancer to face the audience, the eyes are closed or the head is involved in movement. Although Rainer used repetition in earlier works as a device to make movement easier to read, she decided to not repeat any movements in the piece. Trio A is often referred to as a task-oriented performance due to this style of energy distribution, also for its emphasis on a neutral, or characterless, approach to movement execution and a lack of interaction with the audience. The first time the piece was performed it was entitled The Mind is a Muscle, Part 1, and was performed simultaneous, but not in unison, by Rainer, Steve Paxton, and David Gordon. Trio A has been widely taught and performed by other dancers.

Rainer has choreographed more than 40 concert works.

Select choreography
 Three Seascapes (1961) a solo in three parts, with each section exploring a different type of relationship between movement and sound. In the first section, wearing a black overcoat, Rainer trots around the perimeter of the stage to the last three minutes of Rachmaninoff's Piano Concerto No. 2,  occasionally lying down in a scrunched up position on her side. In the second segment, she moves slowly across the  space, moving her body in undulating spasms. In the first performance in the Judson Church gym, La Monte Young and cohorts performed his "Poem for Tables, Chairs, and Benches" by scraping these objects over a concrete floor in the corridor outside the gymnasium. The finale, which was considered to be radical, featured Rainer screaming wildly and thrashing around with a black overcoat and twenty yards of white tulle.
 Terrain (1962) was Rainer's first evening length work. It had a number of sections, including two "Talking Solos,"  with stories by Spencer Holst recited to an unrelated and simultaneous series of movements.
 Continuous Project-Altered Daily (1970) was performed at the Whitney Museum, eventually morphing into the improvisational Grand Union, of which Rainer was a member for two years.
 War (1970), an antiwar dance performed by thirty people at Douglass College protesting the Vietnam War.
 Street Action (1970), an action in protest of the invasion of Cambodia by U.S. forces in 1970. It consisted of three columns of people wearing black armbands and swaying from side to side with bowed heads while moving through the streets of Lower Manhattan.
 This is the story of a woman who ... (1973), a dance drama using projected narrative texts, a vacuum cleaner, and objects invested with strong meanings such as a mattress, a gun, and a suitcase.

Cinematic work

Rainer sometimes included filmed sequences in her dances, and in 1972 she began to turn her attention to directing feature-length films. The feminist tone of her films, characterized by an interest in how the female body was being viewed or objectified by male directors, would have resonated with emerging feminist film theory of the time period, in seminal texts like Laura Mulvey's Visual Pleasure and Narrative Cinema becoming very influential. Her early films do not follow narrative conventions; instead, Rainer's films combine autobiography and fiction, sound and intertitles, to address social and political issues. Rainer directed several experimental films about dance and performance, including Lives of Performers (1972), Film About a Woman Who (1974), and Kristina Talking Pictures (1976). Her later films include Journeys from Berlin/1971 (1980), The Man Who Envied Women (1985), Privilege (1990), and MURDER and murder (1996). MURDER and murder, more conventional in its narrative structure, is a lesbian love story dealing with Rainer's own experience of breast cancer. In 2017, Lives of Performers was included in the annual selection of 25 motion pictures added to the National Film Registry of the Library of Congress being deemed "culturally, historically, or aesthetically significant" and recommended for preservation.

Return to dance
In 2000 Rainer returned to dance and choreography to create After Many a Summer Dies the Swan, for Mikhail Baryshnikov's White Oak Dance Project. In 2006, Rainer choreographed a work entitled AG Indexical, with a Little Help from H.M., which was a reinterpretation George Balanchine's Agon   Rainer continued to choreograph works based on classical pieces, including RoS Indexical (2007), inspired by Vaslav Nijinsky's The Rite of Spring. This work was commissioned for the Performa 07 biennial organized by performance art organization Performa, which has managed Rainer since then.

Subsequent works include Spiraling Down (2010), Assisted Living: Good Sports 2 (2010) and Assisted Living: Do You Have Any Money? (2013), two pieces in which Rainer explores the theatrical and historic motif of tableau vivants among political, philosophical and economic readings.

An exhibition at London's Raven Row Gallery was the first to feature live performances of her 1960's dances during an exhibition of photos and scores from her entire career, in addition to film screenings.

In 2015, she choreographed and presented The Concept of Dust, or How do you look when there's nothing left to move? (2015), commissioned by Performa and The Getty Research Institute, a performance containing choreographed work interspersed with a wide range of political, historical, and journalistic texts read intermittently by the dancers and Rainer herself. This work was presented at The Museum of Modern Art, and later toured European venues including La Fondazione Antonio Ratti in Como, Italy, Marseille Objectif Danse in France, and the Louvre. A latter version of this same dance, called The Concept of Dust: Continuous Project-Altered Annually was performed in 2016 at The Kitchen in New York, and in Marseilles, Porto, and Barcelona in 2017.

Feminism

Reading feminist writing and theory allowed Rainer to examine her own experience as a woman, and she was able to think of herself as a participant in culture and society. Little did Rainer realize that her prior choreography was a direct challenge of the "traditional" dance and ultimately feminist in nature. Throughout the 1980s, Rainer was celibate, and she was determined "not to enter into any more ill-fated heterosexual adventures ..." She began attending Gay Pride Parades and considered herself a "political lesbian." Rainer participated in a demonstration in New York and Washington D.C. to protest the challenges to Roe v. Wade during this same time period. At the age of 56, she overcame her fears of identifying as a lesbian by becoming intimate with Martha Gever. They are still together today.

Feminist Audre Lorde's famous statement posed, "You can't dismantle the master's house using the master's tools." Rainer rebutted her theory by stating, "You can, if you expose the tools."

Rainer was interviewed for the feminist film !Women Art Revolution.

Rainer is referenced in several places as example of artist, feminist, and lesbian in the second edition of Feminism Art Theory edited by Hilary Robinson. For further reading, see chapter 6.2 Lesbian and Queer Practices. p. 398-434.

Recognition
In 1990, Rainer was awarded with a MacArthur Fellows Program award (or "Genius Grant") for her contributions to dance. In 2015 she received the Foundation for Contemporary Arts's Merce Cunningham Award; in 2017 she received a USA Grant. She has also received two Guggenheim Fellowships (1969,1988).

See also
 List of female film and television directors
 List of lesbian filmmakers
 List of LGBT-related films directed by women

References

Bibliography
 

Lambert, Carrie. "Moving Still: Mediating Yvonne Rainer's Trio A," October 89 (Summer 1999): 87-112.
Liza Béar, Yvonne Rainer, and Willoughby Sharp. "Yvonne Rainer," Avalanche Magazine 5 (Summer 1972): 46-59.

Rainer, Yvonne (1974). Work 1961-73. Halifax, Nova Scotia: The Press of the Nova Scotia College of Art and Design, and New York: New York University Press. .

External links

 Facts are Feelings http://www.feelingsarefacts.com
Yvonne Rainer's Trio A on MoMA Learning
Yvonne Rainer's Kristina Taking Pictures on MoMA Learning
HOW TO SEE | Judson Dance Theater: The Work Is Never Done featuring Yvonne Rainer
Yvonne Rainer and other artists interviewed for MoMA Audio: Judson Dance Theater: The Work is Never Done, 2017
Yvonne Rainer: The Concept of Dust--or How do you look when there's nothing left to move?, MoMA
Biography on sensesofcinema.com. By Erin Brannigan.
Review of Feelings Are Facts, by Daniel Ross.
Conceptual Paradise
"Step-by-step guide to dance: Yvonne Rainer"

Archival footage of Yvonne Rainer's Debate 2002 and Three Seascapes in 2002 at Jacob’s Pillow Dance Festival.
Yvonne Rainer gives a lecture at MIT. She discusses and shows video excerpts of works made after 2000.
 The Fales Library at NYU houses the Yvonne Rainer Grand Union performance videotape collection.  This collection contains seven videotapes that document a series of Grand Union performances.  The performances took place on May 28, 1972 at the Joe LoGiudice Gallery at 59 Wooster Street in SoHo.
 Yvonne Rainer papers, Getty Research Institute. Los Angeles, California.

1934 births
Living people
20th-century American women artists
American choreographers
American female dancers
American feminists
American women film directors
Jewish American artists
Lesbian dancers
Lesbian feminists
LGBT film directors
Modern dancers
Political lesbians
Radical feminists
American people of Italian descent
American people of Polish-Jewish descent
American lesbian artists
LGBT people from California
MacArthur Fellows
Experiments in Art and Technology collaborating artists
21st-century American Jews
21st-century American women